Habutarus is a genus of beetles in the family Carabidae, containing the following species:

 Habutarus abboti Baehr, 2008
 Habutarus calderi Baehr, 2008
 Habutarus canaliculatus Baehr, 2008 
 Habutarus chillagoensis Baehr, 2008 
 Habutarus convexipennis Baehr, 2008 
 Habutarus crassiceps Macleay, 1871 
 Habutarus demarzi Baehr, 2008 
 Habutarus eungellae Baehr, 2008
 Habutarus iridipennis Baehr, 2008
 Habutarus kirramae Baehr, 2008
 Habutarus laticeps Baehr, 2008
 Habutarus madang Baehr, 2008 
 Habutarus monteithi Baehr, 2008
 Habutarus morosus Sloane, 1915 
 Habutarus nitidicollis Baehr, 2008
 Habutarus opacipennis Baehr, 2008
 Habutarus papua Darlington, 1968 
 Habutarus parviceps Baehr, 2008
 Habutarus pilosus Baehr, 1996 
 Habutarus punctatipennis Baehr, 2008
 Habutarus rugosipennis Baehr, 2008 
 Habutarus wau Baehr, 2008 
 Habutarus weiri Baehr, 2008

References

Lebiinae